Kobyłka  is a town of almost 22,000 inhabitants in Poland within the Warsaw metropolitan area, located right outside of the Warsaw, near Wołomin in the Wołomin County in the Masovian Voivodeship.

History
Located in a densely forested area, Kobyłka has been a village at least since the 15th century. In the 18th century the village was one of the main centres of production of Kontusz Belts. In 1751 the village was granted with a royal city charter, as an effect of extensive efforts of its owner, Bishop Marcin Załuski, who wanted to turn it into a large centre for pilgrims. However, the plan failed in the effect of the Kościuszko's Uprising and the Partitions of Poland, during which the town was severely damaged by Russian forces during their march towards the Warsaw's suburb of Praga.

Transport
There are two railway stations in the town (Kobyłka and Kobyłka Ossów), located on the Polish Rail Line No. 6 connecting Warsaw with Białystok and the border crossing at Kuźnica.

Sports
The local football club is Wicher Kobyłka. It competes in the lower leagues.

References

External links

 Jewish Community in Kobyłka on Virtual Shtetl

Cities and towns in Masovian Voivodeship
Wołomin County